Nicolas Marroc (born 5 December 1986 in La-Roche-sur-Yon) is a French racing driver.

Career

Formula Renault Campus France
Marroc began his formula racing career in the 2006 Championnat de France FFSA Formule Campus Renault Elf season. He finished ninth overall in the championship, taking seven point-scoring positions from thirteen races including one podium at Lédenon, scoring 44 points.

Formula Renault
In 2007 he participated in the Championnat de France Formula Renault 2.0 with Pole Services and TCS Racing, but was not classified. In the Eurocup, he was a guest driver at Magny-Cours and Barcelona.

The following season, Marroc competed in both the Eurocup Formula Renault 2.0 and Formula Renault 2.0 West European Cup championships for TCS Racing. He failed to score a point in the Eurocup standings. In the West European Cup, he took 28th place in the championship, scoring one point thanks to a tenth place at Le Mans.

Formula Three

In 2009, Marroc stepped up to the German Formula Three Championship with the Racing Experience team. He finished twelfth in the standings after taking six point-scoring positions from eighteen races. Also he appeared as a guest driver in British Formula 3 at Spa, guesting in the National Class.

2010 will see Marroc move to the Formula 3 Euro Series, competing for Prema Powerteam and joining Daniel Juncadella at the team.

Racing record

Career summary

† - As Marroc was a guest driver, he was ineligible for points.

Complete Formula 3 Euro Series results
(key)

24 Hours of Le Mans results

Complete GP2 Final results
(key) (Races in bold indicate pole position) (Races in italics indicate fastest lap)

References

External links

Marroc career statistics at Driver Database

French racing drivers
1986 births
Living people
Formule Campus Renault Elf drivers
Formula Renault 2.0 WEC drivers
Formula Renault Eurocup drivers
French Formula Renault 2.0 drivers
German Formula Three Championship drivers
British Formula Three Championship drivers
Formula 3 Euro Series drivers
European Le Mans Series drivers
24 Hours of Le Mans drivers
International GT Open drivers
Blancpain Endurance Series drivers
GP2 Series drivers
Prema Powerteam drivers
Sébastien Loeb Racing drivers
Ocean Racing Technology drivers
La Filière drivers
Graff Racing drivers